Alberto Cobos Periañez is a Spanish paleontologist. He works in Fundación Conjunto Paleontológico de Teruel-Dinópolis, in Teruel, Spain. He is one of the discoverers of Turiasaurus riodevensis, together with Rafael Royo-Torres and Luis Alcalá.

References

External links
 BBC report on Turiasaurus
 Fundación Conjunto Paleontológico de Teruel''

Living people
Spanish paleontologists
Year of birth missing (living people)